Sandor Palhegyi (born 4 November 1988) is a Hungarian male hammer thrower, who won an individual gold medal at the Youth World Championships.

References

External links

1988 births
Living people
Hungarian male hammer throwers